The Belgium national under-19 football team is the national under-19 football team of Belgium and is controlled by the Belgian Football Association. The team competes in the European Under-19 Football Championship, held every year.  Their biggest success was winning the tournament in 1977, albeit it wore a different name and had a different structure back then.

Competitive Record

FIFA U-20 World Cup Record

UEFA European Under-19 Championship Record

Current squad

See also

 Belgium national football team
 Belgium national under-21 football team
 Belgium national under-17 football team
 European Under-19 Football Championship

References

European national under-19 association football teams
Football